The name of Camaxtle is a Mesoamerican deity that is related to other deities and can refer to:

Mixcoatl 
Xipetotec